BCRA is an acronym that can represent:
 Banco Central de la República Argentina, the Central Bank of Argentina
 Better Care Reconciliation Act of 2017, the U.S. Senate version of the American Health Care Act of 2017
 Bipartisan Campaign Reform Act
 British Cave Research Association
 Bureau Central de Renseignements et d'Action, "Intelligence and Operations Central Bureau", commonly referred as just BCRA, the World War II era forerunner of the SDECE French intelligence service.